IHF Honorary President and Honorary Members is an award established by the International Handball Federation. It is awarded by the IHF Congress to individuals who have rendered outstanding services to the international handball.

At the recommendation of the IHF Council or a member association, retiring chairman and members of bodies may be appointed as honorary president or honorary members by the IHF Congress.

Award
The award consists of the insignia of the IHF Council with full garland in gold and a personal gift. The recipient also receives a pass, entitling him/her to free entry to all handball events held by any member federation around the world. The Honorary president is also sent an invitation by the International Handball Federation to attend the IHF Council meeting. The honorary president may give suggestions on any matter but had not any voting right.

The award was first awarded to Willy Burmeister of West Germany in 1966 when he was made honorary member of the IHF. Paul Högberg of Sweden was made first honorary president while Raymond Hahn of France was made first honorary secretary general.

IHF Honorary Presidents

IHF Honorary Secretary General

IHF Honorary Members

Former IHF Honorary Members
Following is the list IHF Honorary Members who died after getting the award. There are also some members who were awarded the IHF Honorary Membership posthumously; they are marked with star after their name.

References

External links
 IHF Statuts Chapter XXI - Regulations of Awards

International Handball Federation awards